József Szalai (18 December 1892 – 29 November 1990) was a Hungarian gymnast. He competed at the 1912 Summer Olympics and the 1928 Winter Olympics.

References

External links
 

1892 births
1990 deaths
Hungarian male artistic gymnasts
Olympic gymnasts of Hungary
Gymnasts at the 1912 Summer Olympics
Gymnasts at the 1928 Summer Olympics
Sportspeople from Veszprém County
20th-century Hungarian people